Ban Laem is a district (amphoe) in the northeastern part of Phetchaburi province, western Thailand.

History
Originally, the area were Khwaeng Khun Chamnan and Phrommasan under Mueang Phetchaburi District. They were combined and upgraded to a full district in 1904.

Geography
Neighboring districts are (from the southwest clockwise) Mueang Phetchaburi and Khao Yoi of Phetchaburi Province, Amphawa, Mueang Samut Songkhram of Samut Songkhram province and the Bay of Bangkok.

Administration
The district is divided into 10 sub-districts (tambons), which are further subdivided into 73 villages (mubans). There are two sub-district municipalities (thesaban tambon): Bang Tabun and Ban Laem. Ban Laem covers parts of tambon Ban Laem. Bang Tabun covers parts of tambon Bang Tabun and Bang Tabun Ok. There are a further nine tambon administrative organizations (TAO).

References

External links
amphoe.com (Thai)

Ban Laem